Daniella Monet Gardner (née Zuvic; (born March 1, 1989) is an American actress and singer. She first earned recognition for playing Megan Kleinman on the CBS sitcom Listen Up! (2004–05) and Rebecca Martin on Nickelodeon's Zoey 101 (2006–07). She had her breakthrough for playing Trina Vega on Nickelodeon's Victorious (2010–2013), and provided the voice of Mitzi on Nickelodeon's Winx Club (2012) and played Bertha in the Fred films and TV series (2011–2012).

Monet made her film debut starring as Inga Veinshtein in the mystery film Nancy Drew (2007). She has since starred as Gabby Davis in the comedy film Taking Five (2007), and Ellie Skopic in the television film When Duty Calls (2015). Aside from her acting roles, Monet is also known for television presenting; she hosted the sketch-comedy series AwesomenessTV (2013–2015), and the game show Paradise Run (2016–2018).

Early life
Daniella Monet Zuvic was born on March 1, 1989, in West Hills, California. She is of Chilean, Croatian, and Italian descent. She has a brother named Mario.

Career
In 2003, Monet had a recurring role on the NBC drama series American Dreams. Monet landed a recurring role on the ABC sitcom 8 Simple Rules as Missy Keinfield, Rory's love interest in the second season. She has a sister, Sissy (Elena Lyons), who likes C.J.. She was eventually cast as Megan Kleinman in the CBS short-lived sitcom Listen Up! where she starred alongside Jason Alexander. She - along with Taylor Momsen and Miley Cyrus, the latter eventually winning the role - was one of the final three contenders for the lead role in Hannah Montana. She also guest-starred on Zoey 101 appearing in three episodes from 2006 to 2007. She also appeared in the 2010 film Simon Says and in the 2007 films Nancy Drew and Taking Five.

From 2010 to 2013, Monet starred in the Nickelodeon comedy series Victorious as Trina Vega, the elder sister of Victoria Justice's Tori Vega and a fellow student of Hollywood Arts that has no talent and is described as "weird" and "annoying". She also replaced Jennette McCurdy as the character Bertha in Fred 2: Night of the Living Fred, Fred 3: Camp Fred and Fred: The Show.

Monet hosted a Nickelodeon sketch comedy reality series called AwesomenessTV that premiered July 1, 2013, but the show was cancelled after 2 seasons in 2015. It is transplanted from YouTube clips adding new material. Segments included character sketches, celebrity satires, and parody music videos. She also hosted the Nickelodeon game show Paradise Run from 2016 to 2018.

Personal life
Monet is a vegan.

In December 2017, Monet became engaged to Andrew Gardner after six years of dating. They married on December 29, 2022.

On April 3, 2019, the couple announced that they were expecting their first child. In September 2019, Monet gave birth to a son.  In February 2021, Monet gave birth to a daughter.

Filmography

Film

Television

Music videos

Discography

Singles

References

External links

 
 
 

1989 births
20th-century American actresses
21st-century American actresses
21st-century American singers
21st-century American women singers
Hispanic and Latino American actresses
Actresses from Los Angeles
American child actresses
American film actresses
American game show hosts
American podcasters
American television actresses
Living people
People from West Hills, Los Angeles
American people of Chilean descent
American people of Croatian descent
American people of Italian descent
American women podcasters